Adelmo Bulgarelli (23 March 1932 – 20 July 1984) was a heavyweight Greco-Roman wrestler from Italy. He competed in the 1956, 1960 and 1964 Olympics and won a bronze medal in 1956. He also won two medals at the Mediterranean Games in 1955 and 1963 and 11 national titles.

References

External links 
 
 

1932 births
1984 deaths
Olympic wrestlers of Italy
Sportspeople from Carpi, Emilia-Romagna
Wrestlers at the 1956 Summer Olympics
Wrestlers at the 1960 Summer Olympics
Wrestlers at the 1964 Summer Olympics
Italian male sport wrestlers
Olympic bronze medalists for Italy
Olympic medalists in wrestling
Medalists at the 1956 Summer Olympics
Mediterranean Games gold medalists for Italy
Mediterranean Games silver medalists for Italy
Wrestlers at the 1955 Mediterranean Games
Competitors at the 1963 Mediterranean Games
Mediterranean Games medalists in wrestling